Zakho is a city in the Dohuk Governorate of Iraqi Kurdistan in northern Iraq. 

Zakho may also refer to:
 Zakho District, which the city is the capital of
 Zakho FC, the city's association football club
 Zakho (Chaldean Diocese), a Chaldean Diocese centred around the city
 University of Zakho, the city's major university
 Sizwe Zakho, South Africa music producer

See also 
 Zaku (disambiguation)